Dharmacakra may refer to:
 Dharmacakra, a common symbol used in Buddhism.
 Dharmacakra Pravartana Sutra, Sanskrit version of the Buddha's first discourse.          
 Dharmacakra Mudra, a symbolic gesture representing the turning of the wheel of the Dharma
 Dhammacakkappavattana Sutta, the popular name of the Buddha's first discourse as recorded in the Pali canon.
 Karma Triyana Dharmachakra, a Tibetan Buddhist monastery in Woodstock, NY, USA
 Rumtek Monastery, in Sikkim, India, named the Dharmachakra Centre by the 16th Gyalwa Karmapa